Saint James is a small hamlet located roughly 1 mile south of Haubstadt, Indiana in Johnson Township, Gibson County, Indiana, United States, and 1/4 mile north of Vanderburgh County.

Saint James took its name from St. James Roman Catholic Church. The church is the oldest Catholic congregation in Gibson County.

Geography

References

Unincorporated communities in Gibson County, Indiana
Unincorporated communities in Indiana